The Panamerican Squash Federation (FPS) was set up in 1989. It is the governing body of squash on the American Continent and shall at all times seek to advance competition in the sport of squash.

It is based in Medellín in Colombia. As of 2011 it has 28 member federations.

List of members

North America

Central America

Caribbean

South America

Events
Junior Events
Pan American Junior Championships

Seniors' Events
Pan American Championships 
Pan American Team Championships 
Pan American Games

External links
 Federation of Panamerica Official Website

Squash organizations
Squash in North America
Squash in South America
Pan-American sports governing bodies
World Squash Federation